Mörbylånga is a locality situated on the southern part of the island of Öland and is the seat of Mörbylånga Municipality, Kalmar County, Sweden with 1,780 inhabitants in 2010.

Other settlements in southern Öland are Alby, the site of a Mesolithic settlement, and Hulterstad.  The town also has some industrial activity.

References 

Municipal seats of Kalmar County
Coastal cities and towns in Sweden
Swedish municipal seats
Populated places in Kalmar County
Populated places in Mörbylånga Municipality
Market towns in Sweden